Susan Carol Powell (born March 24, 1959) is an American actress, singer, and television personality. A native of Elk City, Oklahoma, Powell began her career as a successful beauty pageant contestant, winning the Miss Oklahoma pageant in 1980 and proceeded to the Miss America crown for the year 1981. A coloratura soprano, she has performed in musical theater and on opera stages around the world.  In 1993, Powell embarked on a new television career, becoming the co-host of Discovery Channel's Home Matters home and garden program in 1993.

Biography
Powell was born and raised in Elk City, Oklahoma, an 8,000 resident town driven by farming, ranching and oil production. Early on, Powell discovered a talent for singing and with the encouragement of her family, pursued it. As a child she sang in local venues, at church functions, and solo singing competitions.

She attended Oklahoma City University, where she studied vocal music under Florence Birdwell and performed in summer stock at the Lyric Theatre of Oklahoma.

After first being crowned Miss Oklahoma, Powell won the 1981 national competition, being named Miss America in September 1980 in Atlantic City, New Jersey.

After her one-year reign, Powell embarked on a singing career, debuting with Seattle Opera in the role of Adele in Die Fledermaus. Calling her performance the "major surprise of the evening," a reviewer from Opera Canada praised "her sparkling stage personality" and pronounced her technique as "fully up to Adele's coloratura requirements." Powell's opera career took her to the New York City Opera to the New Japan Philharmonic. She has sung as a soloist for John Williams and the Boston Pops.

In 1993, Powell introduced the television series Home Matters on the Discovery Channel, which she hosted for nine seasons. Powell continues to tour and lecture, assisting in local preliminary Miss America contests and being one of the judges for the Miss America pageant in 2007. In 2002, Powell was recognized by the Oklahoma Hall of Fame as an Ambassador of Good Will from the state for the second time, the first such recognition occurring in 1981.

Powell performed on the television program Don't Forget the Lyrics in the episode of December 12, 2008, appearing along with Heather French Henry (Miss America 2000) and Kirsten Haglund (Miss America 2008).

References

Official biography at Miss America website

External links

1959 births
Living people
Miss America 1980s delegates
Miss America winners
Miss America Preliminary Talent winners
Oklahoma City University alumni
People from Elk City, Oklahoma